Aiston is a surname. Notable people with the surname include:

George Aiston (1879–1943), Australian ethnographer and outback pioneer
Mark Aiston, Australian sports journalist and sports presenter
Sam Aiston (born 1976), English footballer

See also
Alston (name)
Aston (name)